Lucy Sherrard Atkinson (nee Finley; 15 April 1817 – 13 November 1893) was an English explorer and author who travelled throughout Central Asia and Siberia during the mid-19th century.

Career
Born Lucy Sherrard Finley on 15 April 1817 in Sunderland, Co. Durham, she was the fourth child and eldest daughter among the ten children of Matthew Smith Finley (1778-1847), an East London schoolmaster and his wife, Mary Ann, daughter of William York, perfumer. At the end of the 1830s, she went to Russia, where for eight years she lived in St Petersburg as governess to the daughter of General Mikhail Nikolaevich Muravyev-Vilensky. In 1846 she met Thomas Witlam Atkinson, whom she married in February 1848 in Moscow. Between 1848 and 1853 she accompanied her husband on his travels through Siberia, south to the Kazakh steppes and eastwards as far as Irkutsk and the Chinese border before they returned to Britain in 1858. In his memoirs Sir Francis Galton records that on their return they were much visited by the Russian nobility at their cottage in Old Brompton Road.

Soon after leaving Moscow at the beginning of her travels Lucy became pregnant, and in November 1848, at the small Russian military outpost of Qapal in what is now eastern Kazakhstan, she gave birth to a son whom she and Thomas named Alatau Tamchiboulac Atkinson. His first name, Alatau, came from the nearby Alatau Mountains and his second name Tamchiboulac (a 'dropping spring') came from the Tamshybulak Spring in Qapal famous for its healing properties.

After resting for six months at Qapal, the family continued their travels, only returning to England in 1858, having journeyed for close to 40,000 miles in some of the most inhospitable landscapes in the world. On his return, Thomas wrote two books on their travels, neither of which mentioned his wife or son. This was due to the fact that he had married Lucy bigamously; his first wife Rebecca, from whom he had separated many years before he reached Russia, was still alive and living in London.

In 1863, two years after Thomas' death, Lucy published Recollections of Tartar Steppes and Their Inhabitants and that year was granted a civil-list pension of £100. She received a further Civil List pension of £50 in 1870. Her book was one of the first works to concentrate on the people of the Eurasian Steppe rather than the flora and fauna. It is also one of the earliest travel books written in English by a woman.

Her book is arranged as a series of letters to a friend and shows Lucy to have been an indefatigable traveler who was held in respect by local people, both for her equestrian skills and as a markswoman with pistol and rifle. Her reference to the birth of her son Alatau, in the absence of a medical attendant, offers a further indication of her unusually independent capabilities. The book also contains descriptions of meetings with exiled survivors of the 1825 Decembrist uprising then scattered through Siberia, including M. I. Muravyev-Apostol, I. D. Yakushkin, P. I. Falkenberg, the Volkonsky and Trubetskoy families, the Borisov brothers, and the Bestuzhevs - which her husband could not include in his own books owing to the dedication of his second volume to Tsar Alexander II.

Lucy's work is of interest and importance to historians of the period. During the years she spent in the home of General Muravyev, Lucy knew personally several of the family and friends of the Decembrists in St Petersburg and Moscow, as well as prominent members of the Russian aristocracy.

At the end of her book, she wrote: "I now look back on all those scenes and repeat what we have often said, that willingly would we face ten times more toil and difficulty rather than go down to mother earth without having beheld them". At some point after the publication of her book, Lucy returned to Russia. She eventually came back to London, where she lived in Camden Road, Holloway. 
In 1881 Lucy was living in London in the home of Benjamin C. Robinson, Sergeant at Law, aged 68. Lucy is listed as a cousin to Benjamin, although in fact she was not closely related. She died of acute bronchitis at 45 Mecklenburgh Square, London, on 13 November 1893, and is buried at Tower Hamlets Cemetery Park.

Legacy
Journalist Nick Fielding later wrote the book South to the Great Steppe: The Travels of Thomas and Lucy Atkinson in Eastern Kazakhstan, 1847–1852, which described the expedition of the Atkinson family to the Steppe.

References

1817 births
1893 deaths
British explorers
Female explorers
Explorers of Asia
British travel writers
19th-century British writers
British women travel writers